Andy Hockley is a Welsh actor and singer born in 1959 in Pontypridd, South Wales.

He has performed extensively in theatres around the UK for nearly 40 years. Internationally his work has taken him to Italy, Denmark, Switzerland, Poland, Ireland and Singapore.

On television, he is best known as Mr Jolly of the Roundabout Stop in the BBC's iconic children's programme Playdays. He recorded two series in the mid-'90s and was, in fact, the last Mr Jolly before the programme ended in 1997.

He has appeared in 16 pantomimes at the Belgrade Theatre in Coventry, latterly as Dame.

He also voiced Imp Y Celyn and Adult Tomjon in Cosgrove Hall's adaptations of Terry Pratchett's Discworld novels, Soul Music and Wyrd Sisters.

He played Monsieur Firmin in Cameron Mackintosh's 25th Anniversary tour of 'The Phantom of the Opera' and then reprised the role at Her Majesty's Theatre in London for two years. In 2016 he played Grandpa Potts in the very successful UK/Ireland tour of Chitty Chitty Bang Bang.

Andy is the longest serving Wizard in the acclaimed musical Wicked in London's West End, having performed the role 1,119 times from July 2017 until March 2020, and again from September 2021 to January 2022 (as part of the 15th anniversary company)

From March 2017 to February 2021, he played the part of building contractor and modern slaver Philip Moss in the long-running BBC Radio 4 drama The Archers. The character is currently serving an eight-year prison sentence. In October 2022, he appeared in an episode of the BBC soap opera Doctors as Ron Osborne.

Filmography

References

External links

  
 

Living people
Welsh male stage actors
Welsh male television actors
Welsh male voice actors
1959 births